Anzacia is a genus of South Pacific ground spiders that was first described by R. de Dalmas in 1919.

Species
 it contains fifteen species:
Anzacia daviesae Ovtsharenko & Platnick, 1995 – Australia (Queensland)
Anzacia debilis (Hogg, 1900) – Australia (Victoria)
Anzacia dimota (Simon, 1908) – Australia (Victoria)
Anzacia gemmea (Dalmas, 1917) – New Zealand, Australia (Phillip Is.)
Anzacia inornata (Rainbow, 1920) – Australia (Norfolk Is.)
Anzacia invenusta (L. Koch, 1872) – Australia (New South Wales)
Anzacia micacea (Simon, 1908) – Australia (Western Australia)
Anzacia mustecula (Simon, 1908) – New Guinea, Australia (mainland, Cato Is., Lord Howe Is.)
Anzacia perelegans (Rainbow, 1894) – Australia (New South Wales)
Anzacia perexigua (Simon, 1880) (type) – New Caledonia
Anzacia petila (Simon, 1908) – Australia (Western Australia)
Anzacia respersa (Simon, 1908) – Australia (Western Australia)
Anzacia sarrita (Simon, 1908) – Australian Capital Territory, Victoria, Tasmania
Anzacia signata (Rainbow, 1920) – Australia (Norfolk Is.)
Anzacia simoni Roewer, 1951 – Australia (Western Australia, Victoria)

References

Araneomorphae genera
Gnaphosidae
Spiders of Australia
Spiders of New Zealand